Kanthalloor  is a  village in Devikulam taluk of Idukki district in the Indian state of Kerala. It is a village nestled in the Western Ghats of India. The salubrious climate and the picturesque landscapes and wide variety of tropical crops coupled with the close proximity of Munnar (a major hill station), has transformed this village into a tourist destination.

Crops

Kanthaloor is famous for its wide variety of crops which are not seen in the other parts of kerala. It is the only place in South India where apples are grown. it also includes varieties of Orange, Strawberry, Blackberry, Plums, Gooseberry, Egg fruits, peach & passion fruits and more.

Transportation
The nearest national highway is NH 85 which passes through Munnar and can be accessed from Kanthalloor-Marayoor-Munnar.

Geography

Kanthalloor is a virtually rain shadow village, lying in the eastern side of the Western Ghats near to Marayur
The place is famous for its cool season fruits and vegetables. Kanthalloor is famous for its apple, oranges, plums, peaches and variety of other fruits and vegetables that are not grown in other parts of Kerala. The Anaimudi Sholai National Park(Formerly known as the Mannavan Chola) is the evergreen forest surrounding Kanthalloor. The major places of attraction include Pattisseri Dam, Kulachivayal rocks, Keezhanthoor waterfalls, Irachilppara waterfall and the cave temple of Sri Rama.

Demographics
As of 2011 Census, Kanthalloor had a population of 6,758 with 3,339 males and 3,419 females. In Kanthalloor, 9.9% of the population was under 6 years of age. Kanthalloor had an average literacy of 76.87% lower than the state average of 94%.

Barter System

One of the shops in Kanthalloor village still follow the age old Barter System.  A woman called Ponnamma is running a grocery in Puthoor village near Kanthallooor.  She accepts farm produces like ginger, mustard, garlic, coriander and beans from customers and gives them rice and other essential in exchange.  This shop was following the Barter System ever since her husband Pullarkkad Kochu Narayanan started it in 1962. More than 164 houses depend on the shop of Ponnamma for their provisions.  When the Indian government demonetized bigger currencies in 2016, many nearby villages suffered without enough new currency for transactions.  But the village of Puthoor never suffered because of the Barter system of Ponnamma.

References

External links

The most popular campsite in Kanthalloor is The Ranch, Kanthalloor. It is a professionally managed campsite. It has hosted large groups of up to 50 people and above at the same time. If you are a travel enthusiast, bikers, super bikers, offroaders, schools, colleges, corporates, or families looking to stay in a campsite, do check it out. You can search for The Ranch Kanthalloor on google maps.

Villages in Idukki district